Rafiqul Islam ( – 5 March 2018) was a Bangladeshi physician and medical scientist. He is known for the discovery of food saline (Orsaline) for the treatment of diarrhea.

Early life and education 
Islam was born in 1936 in the then British India's Bengal Presidency (now Bangladesh) in Chauddagram Upazila, Comilla. He passed MBBS from Dhaka Medical College and Hospital in 1965. Later, he received high education in Trinity Medicine and Hygiene in Trinity (UK).

Career 
After passing MBBS, Islam joined the International Center for Diarrheal Disease Research, Bangladesh and retired from this institution in 2000. While working in this organization, he researched various medicines. One of his most important inventions is the food saline (Orsaline). When cholera spread in the refugee camps of West Bengal in India during the Bangladesh Liberation War in 1971, only therapeutic (intravenous) fluid was given to the vein as treatment. But due to the lack of intravenous fluid, it was possible to recover from the disease with its saline disinfected. After the independence of Bangladesh, a widespread publicity campaign was conducted on the use of saline in the treatment of diarrhea. As a result, it was also known as "Dhaka Saline". In the year 1980, the World Health Organization recognized Orsaline. Besides, Bangladeshi non-government organization BRAC played the role of spreading food saline to the remote areas of Bangladesh.

References 

1936 births
2018 deaths
Bangladeshi scientists
Dhaka Medical College alumni
People from Comilla District